The following is a list of the IRMA's number-one singles of 2003.

See also
2003 in music
List of artists who reached number one in Ireland

2003 in Irish music
Ireland singles
2003